Charles Holte may refer to:

Sir Charles Holte, 3rd Baronet (1649-1722) of the Holte baronets, MP for Warwickshire (UK Parliament constituency)
Sir Charles Holte, 6th Baronet (1721-1782) of the Holte baronets, MP for Warwickshire

See also
Charles Holt (disambiguation)
Holte (surname)